The football tournament at the 2005 East Asian Games was held on 29 October to 6 November. The tournament is played by U-23 men national teams.

Venues
 Estádio Campo Desportivo (Macau Stadium)
 Macau University of Science and Technology Sports Field

Group stage

Group A

Group B

Knockout stage

Semi-finals

Third place match

Final

Medalists

References and notes

External links
 East Asian Games 2005 - rsssf.com

2005 in Asian football
football
2005
2005
2005 in Chinese football
2005 in North Korean football
2005 in Japanese football
2005 in South Korean football
2005–06 in Hong Kong football
2005 in Taiwanese football
2005 in Macau football